The 2001 Bulgarian Cup Final was played at Stadion Lokomotiv in Sofia on 24 May 2001 and was contested between the sides of Litex Lovech and Velbazhd Kyustendil. The match was won by Litex Lovech, with Stefan Yurukov scoring the golden goal in the 91st minute.

Match

Details

See also
2000–01 A Group

References

Bulgarian Cup finals
Cup Final
PFC Litex Lovech matches